The Treasurer and Receiver-General of Massachusetts (commonly called the "treasurer") is an executive officer, elected statewide every four years.

The Treasurer oversees the Office of Abandoned Property, escheated accounts, the State Retirement Board, the Office of Cash Management, the Office of Debt Management, the lottery, the state Alcoholic Beverages Control Commission, the Pension Reserves Investment Management Board, the Water Pollution Abatement Trust, the office of Financial Education Programs, The Office of Economic Empowerment, and the office of Deferred Compensation. The Office of the Treasurer and Receiver-General additionally performs the role of Chairman over the independent public authority known as the Massachusetts School Building Authority.

The current Treasurer is Deb Goldberg, who took office January 21, 2015.

Qualifications
Any person seeking to become Treasurer and Receiver-General of Massachusetts must meet the following requirements:
 Be at least eighteen years of age
 Be a registered voter in Massachusetts
 Be a Massachusetts resident for at least five years when elected
 Receive 5,000 signatures from registered voters on nomination papers

List of Treasurers and Receivers-General (1780-present)

See also 
 Government budget

References

External links 
 Official site, via Mass.gov
 John Hull (merchant)

 
Treasurer